The Cagayan Rising Suns were a basketball team owned by the family of Alvaro Antonio, governor of the Province of Cagayan from 2007 to 2016. The team was managed by daughter Criselda Antonio (incumbent mayor of Alcala, Cagayan) and coached by her husband, Alvin Pua. 

The team debuted in 2012 PBA D-League Foundation Cup, finishing with a disappointing 0–9 record. There were many added to their roster including Letran center Raymond Almazan and former FEU stalwart Chris Exciminiano, who still led in rebounding and scoring, respectively. Then, They had a good 2-0 start but lost to Erase XFoliant Erasers, 78–91.

On May 17, 2015, the team announced it will leave the PBA D-League after the 2015 Foundation Cup, following the lifetime ban imposed on coach Alvin Pua. The ban on Pua was imposed after his attack on referee Benjie Montero during the team’s game against Livermarin on May 13, 2015. Pua was also fined 500,000 pesos. Team manager Frederic Collado was also fined 20,000 pesos for his critical comments.

After leaving the PBA D-League, the team was in talks to join the proposed Countrywide Basketball League. However, nothing materialized. 

The team was one of the inaugural clubs in the now-defunct Pilipinas Commercial Basketball League (PCBL) in 2015.

See also
 Cagayan Valley Rising Suns (men's volleyball team)
 Cagayan Valley Lady Rising Suns (women's volleyball team)

References

PBA Developmental League teams